José Albarrán (born 29 April 1935) is a Spanish sprinter. He competed in the men's 100 metres at the 1960 Summer Olympics.

References

External links
 

1935 births
Living people
Athletes (track and field) at the 1960 Summer Olympics
Spanish male sprinters
Olympic athletes of Spain
Sportspeople from Salamanca
20th-century Spanish people